Group 1 of the 1954 FIFA World Cup took place from 16 to 19 June 1954. The group consisted of Brazil, France, Mexico, and Yugoslavia.

Standings

Matches
All times listed are local time (CET, UTC+1).

Brazil vs Mexico

Yugoslavia vs France

Brazil vs Yugoslavia

France vs Mexico

References

External links
 1954 FIFA World Cup archive

1954 FIFA World Cup
Brazil at the 1954 FIFA World Cup
France at the 1954 FIFA World Cup
Yugoslavia at the 1954 FIFA World Cup
Mexico at the 1954 FIFA World Cup